Deadstar is the debut commercial mixtape by American rapper Smokepurpp. It was released on September 29, 2017, by Alamo Records and Interscope Records. The mixtape features guest appearances from frequent collaborator Lil Pump, alongside Chief Keef, Yo Gotti, Juicy J, Travis Scott and DRAM.

It was supported by five singles – "Audi", "Different Color Molly", "To the Moon", "Ok", and "Bless Yo Trap". In December 2019, a sequel to the mixtape was released, Deadstar 2.

Artwork
A friend of Smokepurpp came up with the idea for the album art from infamous punk rock artist GG Allin. On Purpp's album cover, he's seen in a coffin, surrounded by a newspaper clipping, photos of himself, alcohol and a lean bottle. This mimics an infamous photo of the punk rocker at his funeral. Allin died in 1993 due to a heroin overdose and was photographed at his funeral in his coffin with a bottle of Jim Beam and newspaper clippings surrounding him. His corpse was unwashed and unpreserved while wearing his leather jacket and jock strap (a trademark of his).

Singles
The lead single, "Audi." was released on May 19, 2017. The second single, "Different Color Molly" was released on May 26, 2017. The third single, "To the Moon" was released on June 2, 2017. The fourth single, "Ok" was released on July 28, 2017. The fifth and final single, "Bless Yo Trap" was released on September 15, 2017.

Commercial performance
Deadstar debuted at number 42 on the US Billboard 200.

Track listing
Credits were adapted from Tidal.

Charts

References

2017 mixtape albums
2017 debut albums
Interscope Records albums
Smokepurpp albums
Albums produced by Frank Dukes
Albums produced by Harry Fraud
Albums produced by Ronny J
Albums produced by TM88
Cactus Jack Records albums
Debut mixtape albums